Qeshlaq-e Moqaddam Shabandeh (also Romanized as Qeshlāq-e Moqaddam Shābandeh; also known as Qeshlāq-e Shāhbandeh and Qeshlāq-e Moqaddam) is a village in Garamduz Rural District, Garamduz District, Khoda Afarin County, East Azerbaijan Province, Iran. At the 2006 census, its population was 285, in 59 families. The village is populated by the Kurdish Chalabianlu tribe.

References 

Populated places in Khoda Afarin County
Kurdish settlements in East Azerbaijan Province